Lilliputocoris is a genus of dirt-colored seed bugs in the family Rhyparochromidae, the sole genus in the tribe Lilliputocorini. There are about 10 described species in Lilliputocoris.

Species
These 10 species belong to the genus Lilliputocoris:
 Lilliputocoris coatoni Slater, 1994
 Lilliputocoris exiguus Slater, 1979
 Lilliputocoris ghanaensis Slater & Woodward, 1982
 Lilliputocoris grossocerata Slater & Woodward, 1982
 Lilliputocoris neotropicalis Slater & Woodward, 1982
 Lilliputocoris punctatus (Woodward, 1959)
 Lilliputocoris seychellensis Slater & Woodward, 1982
 Lilliputocoris slateri Stys, 1987
 Lilliputocoris taylori Slater & Woodward, 1982
 Lilliputocoris terraereginae Slater & Woodward, 1982

References

Rhyparochromidae